Winchester Symphony House is a historic home located in the Eau Gallie-section of Melbourne, Florida.  The house was built in 1886.  William Treutler, director of the State Bank of Eau Gallie and hotel proprietor in Eau Gallie, built the house. Brevard County and the State of Florida list this building as a historic site.  Currently, the house serves as the headquarters for the administrative staff of the Brevard Symphony Orchestra.

References

Eau Gallie, Florida
Florida cracker culture
Houses in Brevard County, Florida
Buildings and structures in Melbourne, Florida